This is a list of notable Americans who self-identify themselves as Americans of Spanish descent, including both original immigrants who obtained American citizenship and their American descendants.

There are also many people in the United States of Hispanic "national" origin, (e.g. Mexican Americans, Cuban Americans, etc) or other Latin Americans, who self-identify their heritage as being Spaniard in census data.

The list also includes many settlers and descendants of Spanish settlers who lived in the Spanish colonies south of the current U.S. when those territories were incorporated into U.S. and to his inhabitants were given the U.S. citizenship (Louisiana is incorporated in 1803, Florida in 1819, and the Southwest was incorporated in 1848).  
 
This list is ordered by surname within section.

To be included in this list, the person must have a Wikipedia article showing they are Spanish American or must have references showing they are Spanish American and are notable.

List
Artists and designers

 Adela Akers (born February 7, 1933) – American textile artist born in Spain
 Mabel Alvarez (1891–1985) – prominent American artist
 Carlos Baena – Spanish-born American employee in the Pixar studies
 Javier Cabada (born October 25, 1931) – Spanish-born American artist who paints colorful, abstract works
 Eva Camacho-Sánchez – Spanish raised American fashion designer and maker who is focused in felted decorations, jewelry, housewares, and accessories at her company Lana Handmade.
 Federico Castellón (1914–1971) – painter and sculptor born in Almeria, Spain
 Beatriz Colomina (born 1952) – Spanish-born architecture historian
 Julio de Diego (1900–1979) – Spanish-born American visual artist
 Anh Duong (born October 25, 1960) – French-American artist, actress, and model, daughter of a Spanish mother and Vietnamese father.
 John A. Garcia (born 1949) – Spanish-born entrepreneur and philanthropist. He is best known as a pioneer of the modern American computer game industry. 
 Frank Garcia (1927–1993)– American son of Spanish immigrants 
 Xavier Gonzalez (1898–1993) – Spanish-born American artist. 
 Iñigo Manglano-Ovalle (born 1961) – Spanish-born American artist
 Adele Morales (1925–2015) – American painter and memoirist. He is of Spanish and Peruvian descent.
 Wenceslao Moreno (1896–1999) – known to his American fans as "Señor Wences", Moreno was for decades a top ventriloquist in Spain, elsewhere in Europe, as well as in Latin America and the United States. In the US, he was a favorite in vaudeville and, later, television, especially on The Ed Sullivan Show. He was born in Salamanca, Spain, and died at the age of 103 in New York City.
 Stephen Mopope (1898–1974) – Kiowa painter, dancer, and flute player of Spanish descent.
 Victor Moscoso (born 1936) – Psychedelic underground comix cartoonist, born in Galicia and raised in the US.
 Esteban Munras (1798–1850) – 19th-century Spanish artist, probably best known for the vibrantly-colored frescoes that adorn the chapel interior at Mission San Miguel Arcángel in California.
 Antonio Prieto (1912–1967) – Spanish-born American ceramic artist and art professor at Mills College, Oakland, California. He was instrumental in developing an important ceramics collection for the Mills College Art Museum. 
 Narciso Rodriguez, American fashion designer. Son of Cuban parents of Canarian (Spanish) descent
 Richard Serra (born November 2, 1938) – American sculptor. His father was Spanish native of Mallorca and mother was Russian, in Odessa
 Urbici Soler i Manonelles (1890–1953) – American sculptor and art educator.
 Faye Resnick (born July 3, 1957) – American television personality, author, and interior designer. She is of Spanish, Italian and English descent
 Carmen Marc Valvo – fashion designer
 Kat Von D (born March 8, 1982) – tattoo artist of European descent; Spanish ancestry from mom

Business

 Micaela Almonester, Baroness de Pontalba (1795–1874) – Wealthy New Orleans-born aristocrat, businesswoman and real estate developer, and one of the most dynamic personalities of that city's history.
 John Arrillaga (1937–2022) – real estate businessman
 John Casablancas (1942–2013) – American modeling agent and scout. He is credited for developing the concept of supermodel. His parents were Spanish, having escaped Spain during the Spanish Civil War
 Manuel Lisa (1772–1820) – Spanish fur trader, explorer, and United States Indian agent. He was among the founders in St. Louis of the Missouri Fur Company, an early fur trading company, and he was also the first settlers of Nebraska
 Frank Lorenzo (born May 19, 1940) – airline executive who founded Continental Airlines. He is of Spanish parents
 Juan de Miralles (1713–1780) – Spanish-born arms dealer and messenger to the American Continental Congress.
 Edward L. Romero (born January 2, 1934) – entrepreneur and American diplomat who served as the U.S. Ambassador to Spain and Andorra in 1998 - 2001. His family was descended in part of the Spanish settlers who arrived to New Mexico in 1598
 Frank Stephenson (born October 3, 1959) – American automobile designer. He is son of a Norwegian father and a Spanish mother
Unanue family 
 Andy Unanue – former vice president of Goya Foods
 Joseph A. Unanue (1925–2013) – served 27-year tenure as president of Goya Foods, the largest Hispanic-owned food company in the United States
 Rodolfo Valentin (born June 22, 1944) – New York City hairdresser and entrepreneur, to Italian and Spanish parents.
 Benito Vázquez (1738–1810) – Spanish-born soldier, fur trader, merchant and explorer. He emigrated to Missouri when it was part of Louisiana and lived there until the end of his life.
 Louis Vasquez (1798–1868) – American Mountain man and trader. Born in Missouri, he was the son of Benito Vázquez
 Vicente Martinez Ybor (1818–1896) – Spanish-American industrialist and Cuban cigar manufacturer

Entertainment

 Screenwriter, Directors and Producers of film and television 
 Rafael Alvarez (born May 24, 1958) – American screenwriter. He is of Spanish partial descent
 Miguel Arteta (born 1965) – Puerto Rican director of film and television, known for his independent film Chuck & Buck (2000), for which he received the Independent Spirit John Cassavetes Award, and Cedar Rapids. He is of Peruvian father and Spanish mother
 Rafael Casal (born 1985) – American writer, actor, producer, and showrunner. He is of Irish, Spanish, and Cuban descent.
 Jaume Collet-Serra (born March 23, 1974) – Spanish-born American film director and producer.
 Lisa Loomer – playwright and screenwriter of Spanish and Romanian ancestry 
 George A. Romero (1940–2017) – American film director, screenwriter and film editor, best known for his series of zombie apocalypse, beginning with Night of the Living Dead (1968). His father was born in A Coruña, Spain, and raised in Cuba and his mother was a Lithuanian American.
 Carles Torrens (born 1984) – Spanish-born film and television director, screenwriter, editor, and producer.

Actors and actresses

 Luis Alberni (1886–1962) – Catalan actor 
 Maria Alba (1905–1999) – Spanish-born American film actress
 Trini Alvarado (born January 10, 1967) – American actress, Puerto Rican Mother and Spanish father
 Armida (1911–1989) – American actress, singer, dancer, and vaudevillian born in Mexico and of a Spanish father
 Tina Aumont (1946–2006) – American actress daughter of María Montez
 Ariana Barouk – TV host, actress, model, and singer, who represented Cuba in the seventh edition of the environmentally oriented Miss Earth, International Beauty Pageant. His parents are Cubans of partially Spanish descent (her grandmother maternal was Spanish)
 Joan Bennett (1910–1990) – American stage, film and television actress. Her mother was actress Adrienne Morrison, daughter of actor Lewis Morrison, who was of English, Spanish, Jewish, and African ancestry
 Constance Bennett (1904–1965) – American actress sister of Joan Bennett 
 Barbara Bennett (1906–1958) – actress/dancer sister of Joan and Constance Bennett 
 Maria Canals-Barrera (born September 28, 1966) – American actress, voice actress and singer of Catalan descent. 
 Ouida Bergère (1886–1974) – Spanish father and English/French mother
 Carlos Bernard – American actor (24 (TV series)). His mother is from Madrid
 Alexis Knapp (born in Avonmore, Pennsylvania) - American actress. Her mother is Cuban of Spanish descent.
 Paloma Bloyd (born in Chicago, Illinois) – American actress. Her mother is from Spain.
 Fortunio Bonanova (1895–1969) – Spanish born baritone singer and a film, theater, and television actor. 
 Diego Boneta – American actor and singer. His father is Mexican, while his mother was born in the United States, to a Puerto Rican father and Spanish mother
 Richard Cansino – American voice actor and nephew of Rita Hayworth.
 Leo Carrillo (1881–1961) – actor, vaudevillian, political cartoonist, and conservationist. His great-great-grandfather, José Raimundo Carrillo (1749–1809), was a Spanish settler of San Diego, California.
 Charisma Carpenter – American actress (Buffy the Vampire Slayer) of mother of Cherokee and Spanish descent
 Lynda Carter – actress and singer best known as the title character in popular 1970s television series Wonder Woman. Her mother was of Spanish and Mexican descent
 Jessica Chastain – American actress, her father of Spanish descent.
 Imogene Coca (1908–2001) – American actress, her father of Spanish descent.
 Mark Dacascos – American actor and martial artist. His father is of Spanish partial descent.
 Richard Davalos (1930–2016) – American actor of Finnish and Spanish descent
 Cameron Diaz – father was of Spanish-Cuban descent
 Héctor Elizondo – born in New York City, the son of Spanish (Basque)-Puerto Rican parents

 Joe Estevez – actor and Martin Sheen's brother, Spanish father
 Emilio Estevez – American actor, director, writer. Spanish paternal grandfather, from Galicia, Spain.
 Ramón Estévez – American actor, son of Martin Sheen
 Renée Estévez – American actress, daughter of Martin Sheen
 Mel Ferrer (1917–2008) – American actor, director of stage and screen and film producer. Cuban father of Spanish descent
 Santino Fontana – American actor, director, and composer, widely known for playing Greg on the television show Crazy Ex-Girlfriend. He is one quarter Spanish descent
 Trixie Friganza (1870–1955) – American actress of Spanish and Irish parents
 Martin Garralaga (1894–1981) – Spanish-born film and television actor who portrayed more than 200 roles in film and television
 Dominik Garcia-Lorido – American actress who has maternal Spanish-Austrian descent
 Jesse Garcia – actor. His parents are Mexican and Spanish descent
 Joanna García – mother of Spanish descent
 William Gaxton (1893–1963) – American actor of film and theater
 Greg Giraldo (1965–2010) – American stand-up comic
 Lita Grey (1908–1995) – American actress, her mother's family was descended from a Californian Spanish familyChaplin, Lita Grey and Jeffrey Vance. (1998). Wife of the Life of the Party. Lanham, MD: Scarecrow Press, pg. 2–3; .
 Thomas Gomez (1905–1971) – American actor of Spaniard descent
 Myrtle Gonzalez (1891–1918) – American silent film actress. Spanish father
 Pedro Gonzalez-Gonzalez (1925–2006) – American character actor best known for his appearances in a number of John Wayne movies. He was the son of a Mexican American father and a Spanish mother
 Camille Guaty – family is originally from the Canary Islands
 Lena Hall – American actress and singer
 Salma Hayek – of Lebanese and Spanish-Mexican descent
 Rita Hayworth (1918–1987) – American actress and icon. Her father was Spanish dancer Eduardo Cansino, Sr., born in Seville, Spain.
 Kristin Herrera (born 1989) – American actress of Spanish and Portuguese descent (Zoey 101, General Hospital)
 Tom Hernández (1915–1984) – American actor whose characters were always secondary
 Pepe Hern (1927–2009) – American actor whose characters, usually Spanish and Latin, were always secondary. He was brother of Tom Hernández.
 Gaby Hoffmann – American actress. Father is of Spanish and Puerto Rican descent.
 Mikaela Hoover – American actress of Iranian, Italian and Spanish descent
 Paz de la Huerta – indie actress and muse of Zac Posen
 Celina Jade – actress, singer and martial artist
 Anya Taylor-Joy – American-born Argentine and English actress and model. Her English-born mother is of South African  and Spanish descent.
 Lainie Kazan (born May 15, 1940) – American actress and singer of half Spanish Sephardic ancestry
 Dorothy Lamour (1914–1996) – actress of French, Irish and Spanish descent
 Jeanie MacPherson (1886–1946) – American actress, writer, and director from 1908 until the late 1940s. She was of Spanish, Scottish, and French descent
 Roma Maffia American actress of German, Spanish, English, and Afro-Caribbean descent
 Adele Mara (1923–2010) – American actress, active in the mid 20th-century
 A Martinez – American actor of Native American, Spanish, and Mexican descent 
 Velia Martinez (1920–1993) – actress, singer and former nightclub dancer.
 Patricia Medina (1919–2012) – English-born American actress. His father was a Spanish immigrant of Canary Island and his mother was English. 
 Beryl Mercer (1882–1939) – Spanish born American actress of stage and screen who was based in the United States
 Lea Michele – actress and singer; has a Sephardi Jewish father (from a family from Spain and Turkey) and an Italian-American Catholic mother; Michele was raised Catholic
 Marta Milans – actress
 Alfred Molina – English born American naturalized He is of Spanish and Italian descent
 Ricardo Montalbán (1920–2009) – Mexican radio, television, theatre and film actor to Spanish immigrants parents
 Carlos Montalbán – Mexican actor, brother of Ricardo Montalbán
 Amber Montana – American actress. Montana is of Cuban and Spanish descent
 Maria Montez (1912–1951) – Dominican actress of Canarian father
 Yolanda "Tongolele" Montes – exotic dancer and American actress of the Cinema of Mexico. Her father was Spanish/Swedish, her mother French/English. 
 Antonio Moreno (1887–1967) – Spanish-born American educated actor; he was a leading silent film star of the 1920s.
 Frank Morgan (1890–1949) – American actor of German and Spanish ancestry.
 Morris W. Morris (1845–1906) – stage actor and Civil War soldier of the Louisiana Native Guards
 Frankie Muniz – actor (Malcolm in the middle) and racecars driver. His father is Puerto Rican of Asturian (Spanish) descent
 Dylan O'Brien – Spanish maternal great-grandmother 
 Margaret O'Brien – child actress, Spanish mother
 Dylan O'Brien – American actor,  Spanish mother (Teen Wolf and The Maze Runner)
 Carlos Pena Jr. – American actor (Big Time Rush), singer, and dancer. His father is of Spanish and Venezuelan descent, while his mother is of Dominican descent
 Julio Perillán – American actor of Spanish parents
 Anita Pomares, better known as Anita Page – was an American film actress primarily in the 1920s and 1930s and later
 Monica Ramon – American actress born in Spain
 Nathalia Ramos – actress and singer. Spanish father, Sephardi Jewish mother. Played a leading role, Yasmin, in Bratz: The Movie.
 Monica Rial – American voice actress, script writer, and ADR director affiliated with Funimation and Seraphim Digital/Sentai Filmworks. His father is from Galicia, Spain.
 Génesis Rodríguez – American actress. She is the daughter of Venezuelan singer and actor José Luis Rodríguez. Her grandfather is from Canary Islands.
 Cesar Romero (1907–1994) – American actor of Spanish father and Cuban mother
 Ned Romero – American actor and opera singer. His ancestry is He is of Chitimacha Native American, Spanish and French descent
 Anthony Ruivivar – American actor
 Marin Sais – American actress of the silent film era. She is descended of early Castilian settlers of California's colonial
 Ref Sanchez (1917–1986) – American actor of Spanish descent
 Tessie Santiago – American actress of Spanish and Cuban descent
 Reni Santoni – American film, television and voice actor. Santoni is of French and Spanish descent
 April Scott – American actress and model. She is of Spanish partially descent 
 Sarah Shahi – actress and American model of Spanish mother

 Martin Sheen – born 'Ramón Gerardo Antonio Estévez', father from Galicia, Spain
 Charlie Sheen – American actor, Spanish paternal grandfather
 Margarita Sierra (1936–1963) – Spanish born American actress
 Henry Silva – American film and television actor of Spanish and Sicilian descent. 
 Chrishell Stause – of both Japanese and Spanish descent.
 Celeste Thorson – American actress, model, screenwriter, and activist of Lebanese, Spanish, Apache (Native American) and South Korean descent.
 Bitsie Tulloch – mother of Spanish descent
 Alanna Ubach – American actress of Spanish descent
 Erik Valdez – American actor (father of Mexican, Spanish and Native American descent)
 Elena Verdugo – 1940s Spanish-American actress
 Michael Wayne (1934–2003) – American film producer and actor, and the eldest son of actor John Wayne and his first wife, Josephine Alicia Saenz, who was of Spanish descent.
 Patrick Wayne – actor, the second son of John Wayne and Josephine Alicia Saenz
 Raquel Welch (1940–2023) – American actress of Bolivian father (from Spanish descent)Raquel Welch Beyond the Cleavage: Quote: "I WAS BORN in 1940 in the Windy City, Chicago. Not ideal for a new-born baby girl with thin Mediterranean blood, courtesy of my Spanish father."  
 Donna Wilkes – American film actress known for her roles in several films, born to Spanish/French mother and Irish father

Models

 Jimmy Clabots – American actor and model. He is a Cuban and Spanish descent. 
 Jo Collins – Playboy magazine's Playmate of the Month for December 1964 and Playmate of the Year for 1965. Half Spanish.
 Devin DeVasquez – model and American actress.
 Daisy Fuentes – American TV presenter and model. Spanish mother.
 Jenna Haze – American pornographic actress of Spanish heritage.
 Marina Jamieson – fashion model; American father, Spanish mother.
 Jewel De'Nyle – former American pornographic actress and director. She is of Spanish partially descent.
 Chanel Preston – American pornographic actress . She is descendant of Spanish partially.
 D'Nika Romero – model and former basketball player of Spanish descent.
 Nia Sanchez – American actress, model, taekwondo coach and beauty queen who won Miss USA 2014. Her mother is of Spanish partial descent.
 Jenny Spain
 Samantha Torres Playboy Playmate – Spanish native, now an American resident, has son with actor Dean Cain.
 Tori Welles – American former pornographic actress of partial Spanish descent.

Music

 David Archuleta – father of Spanish (Basque) descent.
 Cardi B – rapper of Dominican, Trinidadian and Spanish descent. Her mother is of Spanish ancestry from Trinidad and Tobago.
 Leonardo Balada – Spanish composer.
 Cedric Bixler-Zavala – rock singer of predominantly European descent has Spanish ancestry from father.
 Fortunio Bonanova (1895–1969) – baritone singer and a film, theater, and television actor. He occasionally worked as a producer and director.
 Eduardo Cansino, Sr. (1895–1968) – Flamenco dancer and Spanish actor. Father of Rita Hayworth.
 Julian Casablancas – vocalist and songwriter of the New York band The Strokes.
 Al Cisneros – American musician from San Jose, California. He is the singer and bassist for the legendary stoner metal band Sleep
 Nichole Cordova – singer and dancer. Cordova is a member of the musical group Girlicious.
 Xavier Cugat (1900–1990) – conductor, American Catalan artist and entrepreneur. He was a key figure in the spread of Latin music in the United States popular music.
 Charo – Spanish-American actress, comedian and Flamenco guitarist. She is best known for her exuberant stage presence and provocative outfits.
 Chick Corea – American jazz and fusion pianist, keyboardist, and composer. He is of southern Italian and Spanish descent.
 Jonny Diaz – American contemporary Christian pop artist and brother of Matt Diaz. His grandfather who had emigrated from Barcelona.
 Vernon Duke (1903–1969) – American composer/songwriter, born into a noble family of mixed Georgian-Austrian-Spanish-Russian descent, en Belarus. 
 Gloria Estefan – Mother's parents were born in Pola de Siero, Asturias and Logroño, La Rioja, Spain .
 Joe Falcón (1900–1965) – American accordionist descendant of Cajuns and Spanish settlers (Isleños) of Louisiana. He was the first person recording a song and a Cajun music album.
 Lilian García – American singer and ring announcer born in Spain. Spanish descent via Puerto Rico.
 Jerry Garcia – guitarist and singer for the Grateful Dead. Father was born in La Coruña, Spain.
 Synyster Gates – American musician, best known for being the lead guitarist of the band Avenged Sevenfold. He is of Spanish and German descent. 
 Claudio S. Grafulla (1812–1880) – Spanish-born composer in the United States during the 19th Century, most noted for martial music for regimental bands during the early days of the American Civil War
 Emilio de Gogorza (1874–1949) – American-born baritone of Spanish parents.
 Safeway Goya – singer of The Nobodys, who released an album on Capitol Records and EMI International August 8, 1984. 
 Scott Herren – music producer. His father is Catalan and his mother is Irish and Cuban.
 Eric Himy – American-born classical pianist of French-Spanish-Moroccan descent
 Julio Iglesias – Spanish-born singer with American citizenship.
 Enrique Iglesias – Grammy winning Spanish pop singer songwriter. Spanish father (Julio Iglesias) and Spanish Filipina mother (Isabel Preysler)
 José Iturbi (1895–1980) – Spanish conductor, harpsichordist and pianist.
 Jeanette (singer) – London-born, American-raised singer. She is of Canarian and Maltese descent.
 Joseph Lacalle (1860–1937) – Spanish born American clarinetist, composer, conductor and music critic.
 Kirstin Maldonado – American singer. Her mother is Spanish-Italian
 Jim Martin (born 1961) – former guitarist of Faith No More
 Steve Martin Caro – original lead singer of the 1960s baroque pop band The Left Banke
 Mikaila – American singer of French, Mexican (Aztec) and Spanish descent.
 Chino Moreno – American musician. Child of a Spanish-Mexican father and a Spanish/Chinese mother; 
 Alcide "Yellow" Núñez (1884–1934) – Isleño American jazz clarinetist.
 Kenny Ortega – Emmy Award-winning producer, director and choreographer. Most known for directing the High School Musical series and Michael Jackson's This Is It. Spanish paternal grandparents.
 Franky Perez – American musician best known as a solo artist, singer of Finnish Cello-based rock band Apocalyptica. Son of Spanish and Cuban immigrants.
 Irván J. "Puco" Pérez (1923–2008) – Isleño decima singer.
 Manuel Perez (musician) (1871–1946) – American cornetist and bandleader born into a Creole of Color family of Spanish, French and African descent.
 Achille Rivarde (1865–1940) – American-born British violinist and teacher. 
 Andy Russell (September 16, 1919 – April 16, 1992) – American popular vocalist to Mexican parents of Spanish descent.
 Paul Sanchez – American guitarist and a singer-songwriter. He was a founding member of the New Orleans band Cowboy Mouth, guitarist and one of the primary singers and songwriters for the band from 1990 to 2006. His father was an Isleño of Saint Bernard Parish, Louisiana.
 Matthew Santos – rock and folk singer-songwriter, musician and painter, father of part-Spanish descent.
 Carly Simon – American singer-songwriter, musician, and children's author. Her mother is of Spanish and half Swiss descent.
 Lucy Simon – American composer for the theatre and popular songs. Sister of Carly Simon.
 Joanna Simon (mezzo-soprano) – sister of Carly and Lucy Simon. 
 Mariee Sioux – American folk singer-songwriter. Her father Gary Sobonya is a mandolin player of Polish and Hungarian descent, and her mother Felicia is of Spanish, Paiute, and Indigenous Mexican descent.
 John Philip Sousa (1854–1932) – American composer and conductor of the late Romantic era, known primarily for American military and patriotic marches. His father was of Portuguese and Spanish ancestry.
 Esperanza Spalding – jazz singer and composer.
 Malu Trevejo – Cuban-American singer of Cuban and Spanish descent. 
 Anton Torello – Catalan born American double bass player. 
 Jaci Velasquez – American singer. She descends from Spanish and Mexican settlers in Texas and French, Scottish, and Arabs immigrants.

 Camille Zamora – American soprano, Spanish ancestry on her father's side

 Dancers 
 María Benítez – American dancer, choreographer and director in Spanish dance and flamenco
 Carmencita – Spanish-born American-style dancer in American pre-vaudeville variety and music-hall ballet
 Joaquín De Luz – Spanish ballet dancer. He was formerly with the American Ballet Theatre (ABT), and currently, a principal dancer with the New York City Ballet (NYCB).

Sports

 Pete Alonso- Mets first baseman and 2019 Rookie of the Year. His grandfather was born in Spain and fought for the republicans during the Spanish Civil War. He came to America after Franco overthrew the republic. 
 Barry Alvarez – American football coach. His grandparents immigrated to the United States from Northern Spain.
 Lyle Alzado (1949–1992) – professional American football defensive end of the National Football League. His father is of Italian-Spanish descent.
  Art Aragon (1927–2008) – American boxer
  J. J. Arcega-Whiteside – American football player born in Zaragoza, Spain. His father is Spanish and mother is American.
 Paula Badosa professional tennis player who represents Spain, was born in Manhattan. Her parents are from Barcelona.
 Jonathan Borrajo – American soccer player of Spanish parents. 
 Gene Brito (1925–1965) – American football Defensive end in the National Football League. He was of Spanish and Mexicans parents.
 Pete Carril – American former basketball coach.
 Matt Diaz – American professional baseball outfielder for the Miami Marlins of Major League Baseball. His brother is Jonny Diaz. His grandfather who had emigrated from Barcelona.
 Mary Joe Fernández – professional tennis player and two-time Olympic gold medal winner. Father from Spain.
 Santiago Formoso (1953-) – Spanish-born American soccer defender who spent five seasons in the North American Soccer League.
 Lefty Gomez – born Vernon Louis Gomez, New York Yankees Hall of Fame pitcher. His grandfather was Spaniard.
 Keith Hernandez – MVP-winning baseball player, grandfather from Málaga, Spain.
 Manuel Hernandez (1948-) – Spanish-born American soccer player.
 Chris Gimenez – American professional baseball catcher for the Oakland Athletics
 Al López – Hall-of-Fame baseball player and manager. Spanish parents.
 Mike Lowell – Puerto Rican former professional baseball third baseman in Major League Baseball. His parents were born in Cuba, and are of Irish and Spanish ancestry.
 David López-Zubero – former college and international swimmer who competed in three Summer Olympics and won an Olympic bronze medal.
 Martin López-Zubero – American born, Spanish Olympian swimmer with dual-citizenship. His father is Spanish
 Saoul Mamby – former professional boxer of Spanish and Jamaican descent.
 Alec Martinez – American professional ice hockey player. His paternal grandfather is Spanish.
 Rachel McLish – American female bodybuilding champion, actress and author. Her father was of Spanish ancestry.
 Kimmie Meissner – former competitive figure skater. Her maternal great-grandparents were Spanish immigrants (great-grandfather was from Galicia).
 Midajah – American personal trainer, fitness model and former professional wrestling manager. He is the eldest of four children and is of Norwegian, Irish, Spanish, and French descent.
 Lou Molinet (1904–1976) – first Hispanic-American professional football player to play in the National Football League. 
 Lou Piniella – baseball player and manager, Asturian grandparents
 Hernando Planells – assistant coach of the Maine Red Claws of the NBA Development League and former head coach of the Basketball Japan League (BJ) team Ryukyu Golden Kings. 
 Augusto Perez – former wheelchair curler. 
 Tony La Russa – baseball player and manager, born to Spanish and Italian parents in Ybor City in Tampa Florida.
 Ralph Onis (1908 in Tampa, Florida–1995) – professional baseball. 
 Jack Del Rio – American head coach of the Oakland Raiders of the National Football League (NFL), to a father of Spanish and Italian descent. 
 Rich Rodriguez – Arizona head football coach.
 Fabri Salcedo (1914–1985) – Spanish-born American soccer player.
 Wendy Lucero-Schayes – American former Olympic diver.
 Craig Torres (bodybuilder)
 Benny Urquidez – kickboxer, martial arts choreographer and actor. His father is descended from Basque Spaniards and Blackfoot Amerindians
 Alejandro Villanueva – offensive tackle, Pittsburgh Steeleers. Parents were born in Spain.
 Minh Vu – American soccer player of Spanish and Vietnamese descent. 
 Ted Williams (1918–2002) – American professional baseball player, manager, and World War II and Korean War veteran. His mother was Mexican of Spanish (Basque), Russian, and American Indian descent.

Military (excluding those who were also governors and politicians)

 Santiago Argüello (1791–1862) – soldier in the Spanish army of New Spain in Las Californias, a major Mexican land grant ranchos owner, and part of an influential family in Mexican Alta California and post-statehood California. He was son of Spanish soldier José Darío Argüello
 Terry de la Mesa Allen, Sr. (1888–1969) – Major General, U.S. Army. Decorated World War II Division commander. Allen's maternal grandfather was Spanish Colonel Carlos Alvarez de la Mesa, who fought at Gettysburg for the Union Army in the Spanish Company of the 39th New York Volunteer Infantry Regiment, during the American Civil War.
 Terry de la Mesa Allen Jr. (1929–1967) – Lieutenant Colonel, U.S. Army. Killed in Vietnam War.
 Pierre G. T. Beauregard (1818–1893) American military officer, politician, inventor, writer, civil servant, and the first prominent general of the Confederate States Army during the American Civil War. He was born in a Creole family of French and Spanish descent.
 Santos Benavides (1823–1891) – confederate colonel in the American Civil War. He is descendant of Don Tomas Sanchez, the Spanish founder of Laredo, Texas.
  Stephen Vincent Benét (1827–1895) – officer in the United States Army. His grandfather was a settler of Spanish Florida
 Rudolph B. Davila (April 27, 1916 – January 26, 2002) – United States Army officer, of Spanish descent through his father, who received the Medal of Honor for his actions in Italy during World War II.
 Luis F. Emilio (December 22, 1844 – September 16, 1918) – captain in the 54th Massachusetts Volunteer Infantry, an American Civil War Union regiment.
 Jorge Farragut (1755–1817) – Spanish Navy officer who fought for the American War of Independence. Father of David Farragut.
 David Farragut (1801–1870) – first senior officer of the U.S. Navy during the Civil War. Coined phrase "Damn the torpedoes, full speed ahead!". His father was the Spanish Navy officer Jorge Farragut
 John Horse (ca. 1812–1882) – African-American military adviser to the chief Osceola and a leader of Black Seminole units fighting against United States (US) troops during the Seminole Wars in Florida. He was a Seminole slave of Spanish, Seminole, and African American descent.
 Baldomero Lopez (1925–1950) – first lieutenant in the United States Marine Corps during the Korean War.
 Louis Gonzaga Mendez, Jr. (1915–2001) – highly decorated United States Army officer of the 82nd Airborne Division who in June 1944, as commander of the 3rd Battalion, 508th Parachute Infantry Regiment during World War II, parachuted behind enemy lines into Normandy and was awarded a Distinguished Service Cross for leading an attack that captured the French town of Prétot-Vicquemare, in the Seine-Maritime department. He is descendant of Mexicans, Spanish and Navajo people.
 Juan Moya (1806–1874) – prominent Tejano landowner and Mexican Army captain who fought in the Texas Revolution. He was of Canarian descent.
 John Ortega – first Hispanic sailor to be awarded the United States' highest military decoration for valor in combat – the Medal of Honor – for having distinguished himself during the South Atlantic Blockade by the Union Naval forces during the American Civil War. 
 Elwood Richard Quesada (1904–1993) – United States Air Force General, FAA administrator, and, later, a club owner in Major League Baseball. He was of Irish and Spanish descent.
 Maritza Sáenz Ryan – United States Army officer, and the head of the Department of Law at the United States Military Academy. She is the first woman and first Hispanic West Point graduate to serve as an academic department head. She is daughter of a Puerto Rican father and Spanish mother.
 Manuel Antonio Santiago Tarín (1811–1849) – Tejano soldier and a recruiter and participant in the Texas Revolution on the Texian side. His father was a Spanish officer.

Governors and politicians
 Julian A. Chavez (1808–1879) – rancher, landowner and elected official in early Los Angeles, California, who served multiple terms on the Los Angeles Common Council (the forerunner to the present-day City Council) and the Los Angeles County Board of Supervisors. 
 Rafael Anchia – Democratic member of the Texas House of Representatives. His father is a Spanish Basque. 
 Jerry Apodaca – Democratic Governor of New Mexico (1974–78).
 Polly Baca – American politician who served as Chair the Democratic Caucus of the Colorado House of Representatives (1976–79), being the first woman to hold that office, and the first Hispanic woman elected to the Colorado State Senate. She is a descendant of Spanish and Mexican settlers of New Mexico and Colorado, arrived there in the colonial period.
 Charles Dominique Joseph Bouligny (1773–1833) – lawyer and politician. He was U.S. Senator from Louisiana between 1824 and 1829. He was son of Francisco Bouligny.
 Dionisio Botiller (1842–1915) – elected a member of the Los Angeles, California, Common Council, the governing body of the city. Botiller's Spanish-heritage family settled in California in the 18th Century, living near Santa Barbara.
 Kate Brown – Democratic Governor of Oregon since 2015.
 Carlos Lopez-Cantera – Republican politician from Miami, who served in the Florida House of Representatives before being appointed the 19th Lieutenant Governor of Florida (2014-2018)
 Carlos Antonio Carrillo (1783–1852) – Governor of Alta California, (1837–1838)
 José Antonio Carrillo (1796–1862) – Californio ranchero, official and political. He was mayor of Los Angeles, California (1826, 1828, and 1833).
 Juan José Carrillo (1842–1916) – first mayor of Santa Monica, California
 Pedro Casanave (c.1766–1796) – Spanish merchant who became the Master Masonic and fifth mayor of Georgetown (modern Washington DC). Casanave is particularly remembered for having buried the first stone in what later became the White House, on October 12, 1792.
 Ezequiel Cabeza De Baca (1864–1917) – first Hispano elected for office as Lieutenant Governor in New Mexico's first election. He was a descendant of the original Spanish settlers which later became part of the Baca Family of New Mexico.
 Dennis Chavez (1888–1962) – Democratic U.S. Senator from the State of New Mexico.
 Linda Chavez – father's family came to New Mexico from Spain in 1601.
 Henry Cisneros – politician and businessman
 Page Cortez (born 1961) – businessman from Lafayette, Louisiana, who is a Republican member of the Louisiana State Senate from District 23.
 Ted Cruz – U.S. Senator from Texas since 2013. His father is the Cuban son of a Spanish father from the Canary Islands
 Manuel Dominguez (1804–1882) – Mayor of Los Angeles (1832). He was of Spanish settlers descent.
 Albert Estopinal (1845–1919) – sugar cane planter from St. Bernard Parish, Louisiana, who served as a Democrat in both houses of the Louisiana State Legislature between 1876 and 1900 and in the United States House of Representatives from Louisiana's 1st congressional district from 1908 until his death. Their ancestors came from the Canary Islands, Spain.
 José Joaquín Estudillo (1800–1852) – second alcalde of Yerba Buena, California (the precursor to San Francisco), and whose land holdings, known as Rancho San Leandro, formed the basis of the city of San Leandro.
 Joachim Octave Fernández (1896–1978) – member of the U. S. House of Representatives representing the state of Louisiana. He was a Democrat.
 Fernando Ferrer – Borough President of The Bronx from 1987 to 2001, and was a candidate for Mayor of New York in 2001 and the Democratic Party nominee for Mayor in 2005
 Bill Flores (1954–) – member of the U. S. House of Representatives representing the state of Texas. He is a Republican.

 Bernardo de Gálvez (July 23, 1746 – November 30, 1786) – Spanish military leader and colonial administrator who served as colonial governor of Louisiana and Cuba, and later as Viceroy of New Spain. The US Senate passed, in December 2014, the granting of Honorary citizenship to Bernardo de Galvez, because he aided the American Thirteen Colonies in their quest for independence and led Spanish forces against Britain in the Revolutionary War.
 John Garamendi (1945–) – member of the U. S. House of Representatives representing the state of California. He was a Democrat.
 Antonio Maria de la Guerra (1825–1881) – Mayor of Santa Barbara, California, several times a member of the Santa Barbara County Board of Supervisors, California State Senator and Captain of California Volunteers in the American Civil War. He was son of Spanish soldier José de la Guerra y Noriega.
 José Gonzáles – American politician who served as first Mayor of Gonzales, Louisiana, between 1922/28 and 1932, and is considered the best mayor of that village.
 Joseph Marion Hernández (1793–1857) – American politician, plantation owner, and soldier. He was the first Delegate from the Florida Territory, becoming the first Hispanic American to serve in the United States Congress. His parents were Spanish settlers of St. Augustine in what was then East Florida.
 Vito Lopez – American politician, former member of the New York State Assembly.
 Manuel Lujan Jr – Republican Congressman from New Mexico & Secretary of Interior.
 Francisco Antonio Manzanares (1843–1904) – businessman and politician.
 Luis H. Marrero (1847–1921) – chief of police in Jefferson Parish in New Orleans, president of parish's government between 1884 and 1916 and senator from Louisiana from 1892 to 1896. He was descend of Spanish settlers from Canary Island.

 Bob Martinez – former and first Hispanic Governor of Florida, grandson of Spanish immigrants.
 Antonio Menchaca (1800–1879) – Mayor of San Antonio, Texas (1838 - 1839) y military who fought in the Texas Revolution. He was a Tejano  whose parents were of Spanish descent.Coalson, Handbook of Texas His great-great-grandfather was one of the founders  and early settlers of Béxar.
 Joseph Montoya (1915–1978) – Democratic U.S. Senator from the State of New Mexico.
 Francisco Portusach Martínez (1864–1919) – Spanish merchant and whaler who was briefly the Governor of Guam, before he was deposed. 
 Ramón Músquiz (1797–1867) – governor of Mexican Texas from 1830 to 1831 and 1835.
 Antonio Narbona (1773–1830) – Spanish soldier born in Mobile, now in Alabama, when this belonged to Spanish Louisiana. He was Governor of Santa Fe de Nuevo México between September 1825 and 1827 and he fought Native American people in the northern part of Mexico (now the southwestern United States) around the turn of the nineteenth century. He was of pure Spanish ancestry.
 Sammy Nunez – Louisiana politician of Canarian, or Isleño descent.
 Samuel B. Nunez, Jr. – politician and businessman from St. Bernard Parish, Louisiana. He is son of Sammy Nunez.
 Miguel Antonio Otero (1829–1882) – Spanish politician of the New Mexico Territory.
 Miguel Antonio Otero (1859–1944) – Governor of New Mexico Territory (1897–1906).
 Mariano S. Otero (1844–1904) – delegate from the Territory of New Mexico.
 Leander Perez (1891–1969) – Louisiana judge and politician of Isleño descent.
 Pío Pico (1801–1894) – last Governor of Alta California under Mexican rule. He was of Native American, Spanish and African mixed-race ancestry.
 Andrés Pico (1810–1876) – Californio rancher, military commander and was elected to the state assembly and senate after California became a state. Andrés Pico was the younger brother of Pío Pico
 Bill Richardson – American politician, who served as the 30th Governor of New Mexico from 2003 to 2011. His mother is the Mexican daughter of a Spanish father from Villaviciosa, Asturias (Spain) and a Mexican mother

 Henry "Junior" Rodríguez – politician from St. Bernard Parish, Louisiana of Isleño descent.
 William E. Rodriguez (1879–1970) – American socialist politician and lawyer. he was the first Hispanic elected to the Chicago City Council. He was of Spaniard and German descent.
 Ken Salazar – 50th United States Secretary of the Interior, in the administration of President Barack Obama from 2009 to 2013. He is a descendant of Spanish settlers in New Spain in 16th century.
 José de la Cruz Sánchez (1799–1878) – eleventh Alcalde of San Francisco in 1845.
 Francisco Sanchez (1805–1862) was Commandante of the San Francisco Presidio and the eighth alcalde of San Francisco, California in 1843. He was brother of José de la Cruz Sánchez.
 Erasmo Seguín (1782–1857) – prominent citizen and politician in San Antonio, Texas. He was of French and Spanish descent in San Antonio de Bexar (now San Antonio, Texas).
 Juan Seguín (1806–1890) – Texas senator, mayor, judge, and justice of the peace and a prominent participant in the Texas Revolution. He was son of Erasmo Seguín.
 Éamon de Valera (1882–1975) – American born leader of Ireland's struggle for independence from Britain in the War of Independence and of the anti-Treaty opposition in the ensuing Irish Civil War (1922–1923). He was the founder of Fianna Fáil, head of government (President of the Executive Council, later Taoiseach) and President of Ireland (1959–1973). He was son to an Irish mother and a Spanish father.
 Mariano Guadalupe Vallejo (July 4, 1807 – January 18, 1890) – Californio military commander, politician, and rancher.
 Juan Verde – political, business and social entrepreneur from the Canary Islands and adviser to President Obama and several Democratic political campaigns
 Agustín V. Zamorano (1798–1842) – printer, soldier, and provisional Mexican colonial Governor of Alta California. He was born in Florida, by which him obtained the American citizenship when the territory be joined to United States

 Sheriff, police, Texas Ranger and lawyers 
 Eugene W. Biscailuz (1883–1969) – Sheriff of Los Angeles County. His mother was descended from old Spanish settlers of California.
 Tony Bouza – 40-year veteran of municipal police, serving as Minneapolis police chief from 1980 to 1989. He was born in Spain
 Alex Ferrer – American television personality, lawyer, and retired judge who presides as the arbiter on Judge Alex.
 Manuel T. Gonzaullas (July 4, 1891 – February 13, 1977) – Spanish born American Texas Rangers captain and a staff member of the Texas government.
 Alonzo Morphy (1798–1856) – American lawyer serving as Attorney General of Louisiana (1828–1830), and a Justice of the Louisiana Supreme Court (1839–1846). He was of Spanish, Portuguese and Irish descent.
 Rafael Piñeiro – Spanish-born American who served as First Deputy Commissioner of the New York City Police Department (NYPD).
 Manuel Real – judge of the U.S. District Court for the Central District of California. 
 Tomas Avila Sanchez (1826–1882) – American soldier, sheriff and public official, was on the Los Angeles County, California, Board of Supervisors and was a member of the Los Angeles Common Council, the legislative branch of the city. He was descendant of Spanish settlers.
 Michael G. Santos – American prison consultant, author of several books about prison, a professor of criminal justice, and an advocate for criminal justice reform. Santos is the son of a Cuban immigrant father and a mother of Spanish descent.

 Journalists and Reporters 
 Krystal Fernandez – American sports journalist. 
 Bill Gallo (1922–2011) – cartoonist and newspaper columnist for the New York Daily News.
 Steve Lopez – American journalist who has been a columnist for The Los Angeles Times since 2001. He is the son of Spanish and Italian immigrants.
 Suzanne Malveaux – TV news reporter. She comes from a Creole family in Louisiana of French, Spanish and African origin.
 Craig Rivera – American television journalist, producer, and correspondent for Fox News Channel. His father was a Puerto Rican of Sephardic Jew descent.
 Sebastian Junger – American journalist, most famous for the best-selling book The Perfect Storm: A True Story of Men Against the Sea (1997)
 Geraldo Rivera – American lawyer, journalist, writer, reporter and talk show host. His father was of Puerto Rican Sephardic Jew ancestry. He is brother of Craig Rivera.
 Maria Rozman – Spanish-born Telemundo Washington DC's News Director.
 Rosana Ubanell – Spanish-born American naturalized news journalist and the first Spanish language novelist to ever be published by Penguin Books

Novelist, poets and cartoonists of comic books

 Alberto Acereda (1965–) – writer, professor of Spanish language and literature in USA and Spanish author of numerous articles on politics and op-eds in several European and American newspapers.
 Mercedes de Acosta (1893–1968) – poet and playwright, also known for her lesbian affairs with Greta Garbo and Marlene Dietrich.
 Felipe Alfau (1902–1999) – Catalan novelist and poet.
 Jaime de Angulo (1887–1950) – linguist, novelist, and ethnomusicologist in the western United States. He was born in Paris of Spanish parents. 
 Estelle Anna Lewis (1824–1880) – United States poet and dramatist. She was of English and Spanish descent.
 Sergio Aragonés – Spanish born-American cartoonist and writer known for his contributions to Mad Magazine and creator of the comic book Groo the Wanderer."
 José Argüelles (1939–2011) – American New Age author and artist. His father was Spanish.
 Ivan Argüelles – American poet and brother of Jose Argüelles.
 Alexander Argüelles – American linguist and son of Ivan Argüelles.
 Hilario Barrero – Spanish poet and teacher.
 Stephen Vincent Benét (1898–1943) – American author, poet, short story writer, and novelist. 
 Manuel Gonzales (1913–1993) – Spanish born-American Disney comics artist.
 Amber L. Hollibaugh – American writer, film-maker and political activist. She is the daughter of a Romany father of Spanish descent and an Irish mother.
 Andrew Jolivétte – American author and lecturer of Spanish partially descent.
 Odón Betanzos Palacios (1925–2007) – poet, novelist and Spanish literary critic.
 Carmen M. Pursifull – English-language free verse poet and former New York City Latin dance and Latin American music figure in the 1950s. She is of Puerto Rican and Spanish descent. 
 Anaïs Nin – born Angela Anaïs Juana Antolina Rosa Edelmira Nin y Culmell, was an American author born to Spanish-Cuban parents in France, where she was also raised.
 George Rabasa – American writer and author
 Matthew Randazzo V – American true crime writer and historian. He is of Sicilian-American, Isleño, and Cajun descent.
 George Santayana (1863–1952) – Spanish born, philosopher, essayist, poet, and novelist.
 Jose Yglesias (1919–1995) – American novelist and journalist. Yglesias was born in the Ybor City section of Tampa, Florida, and was of Cuban and Spanish descent. His father was from Galicia.
 Rafael Yglesias (1954–) – American novelist and screenwriter. His parents were the novelists Jose Yglesias and Helen Yglesias.

 Ranchers and Landowners 
 José Antonio Aguirre (early Californian) (1799–1860) – merchant and rancher in Alta California.
 Arcadia Bandini de Stearns Baker (1825–1912) – wealthy Los Angeles Landowner. She was the granddaughter of the Spanish captain José María Estudillo.
 Eulogio F. de Celis (?–1903) – predominant landowner in the San Fernando Valley section of Los Angeles, California, in the mid-19th Century. He was son of Spanish settlers.
 Eulalia Pérez de Guillén Mariné (1766?–1878) – Californio supercentenarian and owner of Rancho del Rincón de San Pascual (Southern California).
 Bernardo Yorba (1800–1858) – one of the most successful ranchers in Alta California, having thousands of cattle and horses grazing on land grants totaling more than 35,000 acres. He was son of Spanish soldier, José Antonio Yorba.

 Religious 
 Emilio S. Allué (1935–2020) – Spanish-born American prelate of the Roman Catholic Church. 
 Joseph Sadoc Alemany (1814–1888) – Catalan American Roman Catholic archbishop and missionary. He was naturalized in the United States in 1840.
 Eusebius J. Beltran – American prelate. His father was Spanish. 
 Francisco Mora y Borrell (1827–1905) – Catalan American Roman Catholic priest
 Thaddeus Amat y Brusi (1810–1878) – Roman Catholic Catalan cleric who eventually became Bishop of Los Angeles, California.
 Henriette DeLille (1813–1862) – founded the Catholic order of the Sisters of the Holy Family in New Orleans, which was composed of free women of color. Her mother was a Creole of color of French, Spanish and African ancestry and was born in New Orleans.
 Robert Fortune Sanchez (1934–2012) – Archbishop of the Roman Catholic Archdiocese of Santa Fe, New Mexico. Some of his ancestors were Spanish settlers in New Mexico.
 Josu Iriondo – Spanish born American prelate of the Roman Catholic Church. He currently serves as an auxiliary bishop of the Archdiocese of New York.
 Antonio José Martínez (1793–1867) – Nuevomexicano priest, educator, publisher, rancher, farmer, community leader, and politician.
 Ricky Rodriguez (1975–2005) – former member of the Children of God (COG), now known as The Family International (TFI). 
 Alfredo Méndez-Gonzalez (1907–1995) – American Catholic bishop who served in Puerto Rico. He was of Spanish and Puerto Rican descent.
 José González Rubio (1804–1875) – Roman Catholic friar prominent in the early history of California.
 Peter Morales – President of the Unitarian Universalist Association, elected in 2009. Morales is the first Latino president. He is of Mexican and Spanish descent.
 David Arias Pérez – Spanish-born Recollect friar in the United States. 
 Peter Verdaguer y Prat (December 10, 1835 – October 26, 1911) – Catalan-born American prelate of the Roman Catholic Church. 
 Francisco González Valer – Spanish-born American prelate of the Roman Catholic Church.

 Scholars, Professors and academics 

 Gloria Anzaldúa (1942–2004) – scholar of Chicana cultural theory, feminist theory, and queer theory. She descendant of many of the prominent Basque and Spanish explorers and settlers to come to the Americas in the 16th and 17th centuries.
 Ángel Cabrera – Spanish academic and sixth President of George Mason University.
 Larrie Ferreiro (born June 11, 1958) – American historian to a Spanish great-grandfather.
 Ernest Fenollosa (1853–1908) – American professor of philosophy and political economy at Tokyo Imperial University and art historian of Japanese art.
 Frank Micheal Fernández, Jr. (1918–2001) – notable Isleño educator, historian, and community leader in St. Bernard Parish.
 Jorge Ferrer – chair of the department of East-West Psychology at the California Institute of Integral Studies. 
 Karl Hess (1923–1994) – American speechwriter and author. He was of German and Spanish descent.
 Juan José Linz (1926–2013) – Spanish sociologist and political scientist. He was of German father and Spanish mother.
 Andrew Jolivétte – American author and lecturer who is employed at San Francisco State University as an associate professor in American Indian Studies and an instructor in Ethnic Studies, Educational Leadership, and Race and Resistance Studies.
 Xavier Sala-i-Martin (born June 17, 1962, Cabrera de Mar, Barcelona, Catalonia Spain) – Catalan-American professor of economics at Columbia University.
 Carlos Fernández-Pello – Spanish-born faculty member of the University of California, Berkeley, Department of Mechanical Engineering.
 Juan Bautista Rael (1900–1993) – Nuevomexicano ethnographer, linguist, and folklorist who was a pioneer in the study of the Nuevomexicanos, his stories and his language, both from Northern New Mexico and Southern Colorado.

Scientists, inventors and engineers 

 Luis F. Álvarez (1853–1937) – Spanish-born American doctor. He developed diagnosis for macular leprosy
 Luis W. Alvarez (1911–1988) – American scientist. He was a Nobel Prize-winning physicist and key participant in the Manhattan Project
 Walter Alvarez (born October 3, 1940) – American geologist who first proposed the asteroid-impact theory to explain the extinction of the dinosaurs
 Walter C. Alvarez (1884–1978) – American doctor of Spanish descent. He authored several dozen books on medicine, and wrote introductions and forewords for many others. Referred to as "America's Family Doctor" for his syndicated medical column in hundreds of newspapers. 
 Francisco J. Ayala (born March 12, 1934) – Spanish-born American biologist and philosopher, recipient of the 2010 Templeton Prize
 Isador Coriat (1875–1943) – American psychiatrist and neurologist. He was one of the first American psychoanalysts. He was of Moroccan-Spanish descent on father's side and German on mother's side.
 Pedro Cuatrecasas (born 27 September 1936) – American biochemist and an Adjunct Professor of Pharmacology & Medicine at the University of California, San Diego
 Valentín Fuster (born January 20, 1943) – Catalan American cardiologist
 Rafael Guastavino (1842–1908) – Spanish-born building engineer and builder who lived in the United States since 1881 until his death; his career was based in New York City. The vaults of hundreds buildings in the eastern US were built based on his design.
 Rodolfo Llinás (born December 16, 1934) – Professor of Neuroscience and Chairman of the department of Physiology & Neuroscience at the NYU School of Medicine. Born in Bogotá (Colombia), with Spanish grandfather.
 Michael Lopez-Alegria (born May 30, 1958) – Spanish-born American astronaut. Holds American record for most EVA hours (spacewalks or moonwalks). Born in Madrid.
 Miguel A. Sanchez – Spanish-born American board-certified pathologist who specializes in anatomic pathology, clinical pathology and cytopathology.
 Severo Ochoa (1905–1993) – Spanish-born Nobel Prize-winning biochemist who worked on the synthesis of RNA
 Ramón Verea (1833–1899) – Spanish journalist, engineer and writer. Inventor of a calculator with an internal multiplication table

 Philanthropists, activists, revolutionaries, community leaders 
 Helene Hagan – Moroccan born American anthropologist and Amazigh activist. She is of Berber and Catalan descent.
 Yasmin Aga Khan (1949–) – philanthropist with Spanish blood from her mother, Rita Hayworth.
 Juan Bautista Mariano Picornell y Gomila (1759–1825) – Spanish-born revolutionary.
 Concepción Picciotto (1936–2016) – also known as Conchita or Connie, Spanish-born American that has lived in Lafayette Square, Washington, D.C. on the 1600 block of Pennsylvania Avenue, in a peace camp across from the White House, since August 1, 1981, in protest of nuclear arms
 Alberto Rivera (1935–1997) – Canarian-born American anti-Catholic religious activist who was the source of many of fundamentalist Christian author Jack Chick's conspiracy theories about The Vatican.
 Tony Serra (1934–) – American civil rights lawyer, activist and tax resister from San Francisco. 
 Andrea Heinemann Simon (1909–1994) – community leader and the mother of award-winning singer, Carly Simon. She is of Spanish-Swiss descent.

Others

 Aida de Acosta (1884–1962) – first woman to fly a plane solo motor. 
 José Andrés (1969–) – Spanish born-American naturalized chef.
 Concepción Argüello (1791–1857) – Alta Californian noted for her romance with Nikolai Rezanov, a Russian promoter of the colonization of Alaska and California. She was the daughter of José Darío Argüello, the Spanish governor of Alta California and Presidio Commandante.
 John Henry Carpenter (1928–1998) – most widely known as the friend and accused murderer of actor Bob Crane in 1978. He was of Native American and Spanish heritage. 
 Raymond Fernandez (1914–1951) – and his common-law wife Martha Beck became known as The Lonely Hearts Killers''.
 Manuel A. Gonzalez (1832–1902) – 19th-century Spanish steamship captain and was one of the first permanent settlers of Fort Myers, Florida. He became a naturalized U.S. Citizen in May 1859, in Key West, Florida.
 Perez Hilton – American blogger and television personality.

 Rita de Acosta Lydig (1875–1929) – socialite. She was considered "the most picturesque woman in America".
 Paul Charles Morphy (1837–1884) – American chess player.
 Tony Pastor (May 28, 1837 – August 26, 1908) – American impresario. His father was a Spanish immigrant.
 Ignacio Peralta (1791–1874) – Spanish settler in California and son of Spanish soldier Luís María Peralta.
 Kika Perez, aka Ilva Margarita Perez – Colombian American actress/TV host of Spanish descent.
 Augusto Perez (1972–) – retired Spanish-born American wheelchair curler. 
 Manuel Torres (1762–1822) – Spanish-born American publicist and diplomat. He was the first ambassador of Colombia between June 19, 1822, and July 15, 1822
 JWoww – American television personality, of Spanish-Irish descent.

See also
 Criollos
 Catalan American
 Galician American
 Basque-American
 Canarian American (Isleños in Louisiana)
 Hispanic American
 List of Puerto Ricans
 Californio
 Neomexicano
 Tejano
 List of Hispanos
 Spanish Filipinos
 Spanish Argentine
 Spanish Mexicans

References

Lists of American people by ethnic or national origin
 
Spanish American
Americans
Lists of people by ethnicity